Tendulkar (Marathi: तेंडुलकर) is a surname found among Marathas and RSB of Maharashtra, India.

Origin

Notable people
People with Tendulkar as surname:

 Sachin Tendulkar, former Indian cricketer
 Dinanath Gopal Tendulkar, an Indian writer
 Priya Vijay Tendulkar, an Indian actress
 Suresh Tendulkar, an Indian economist
 Vijay Tendulkar, an Indian playwright
 Arjun Tendulkar, Mumbai cricketer

References